Adrian Pigulea (born 12 May 1968) is a retired Romanian football striker.

Honours
Universitatea Craiova
Liga I: 1990–91
Cupa României: 1990–91

References

1968 births
Living people
Romanian footballers
CS Universitatea Craiova players
Aris Limassol FC players
FC Progresul București players
Association football forwards
Romanian expatriate footballers
Expatriate footballers in Cyprus
Romanian expatriate sportspeople in Cyprus
Liga I players
Liga II players
Cypriot First Division players
Romania international footballers